Bhangal Kalan is a village in Shaheed Bhagat Singh Nagar district of Punjab State, India. Kalan is Persian language word which means Big and Khurd is Persian word which means small when two villages have same name then it is distinguished as Kalan means Big and Khurd means Small with Village Name. The village is administrated by Sarpanch an elected representative of the village.

Demography 
As of 2011, Bhangal Kalan has a total number of 385 houses and population of 1890 of which 970 include are males while 920 are females according to the report published by Census India in 2011. The literacy rate of Bhangal Kalan is 77.79%, higher than the state average of 75.84%. The population of children under the age of 6 years is 197 which is 10.42% of total population of Bhangal Kalan, and child sex ratio is approximately 824 as compared to Punjab state average of 846.

Most of the people are from Schedule Caste which constitutes 42.91% of total population in Bhangal Kalan. The town does not have any Schedule Tribe population so far.

As per the report published by Census India in 2011, 590 people were engaged in work activities out of the total population of Bhangal Kalan which includes 542 males and 48 females. According to census survey report 2011, 96.78% workers describe their work as main work and 3.22% workers are involved in Marginal activity providing livelihood for less than 6 months.

Education 
The village has a Punjabi medium, co-ed primary school founded in 1953. The schools provide mid-day meal as per Indian Midday Meal Scheme. As per Right of Children to Free and Compulsory Education Act the school provide free education to children between the ages of 6 and 14.

KC Engineering College and Doaba Khalsa Trust Group Of Institutions are the nearest colleges on the way to Nawanshahr.

Landmarks 
The village has two Sikh shrines Gurudwara Singh Sabha and Gurudwara Kalgidhar Sahib where a fair held annually which attended by people of all religion. Peeran Da Thaan, Patka Baba Balak Nath Ji , Shiv Mandir and Dhathal 108 Sant Baba Rala Ram Ji are religious sites.

Festival and fairs
People celebrate festivals and fairs annually in Bhangal Kalan which have taken a semi-secular meaning and are regarded as cultural festivals by people of all religions.

 Lakh Data Peer Shinj Mela (Traditional Wrestling Tournament)
 Kabaddi tournament
 yearly "Vishal Jagran"

Transport 

See also 
List of villages in India

References

External links 
 Tourism of Punjab 
 Census of Punjab
 Locality Based PINCode

Villages in Shaheed Bhagat Singh Nagar district